Events in the year 1884 in Spain.

Incumbents
Monarch: Alfonso XII
Prime Minister: Antonio Cánovas del Castillo

Events
April 27 - Spanish general election, 1884

Births

Deaths

References

 
1880s in Spain